Secret Weapon was a New York-based short-lived post-disco music group, formed by Jerome Prister.  The group had a number of hits throughout the 1980s with their most successful single being "Must Be the Music" which hit #24 on the R&B chart and #66 on the dance chart in 1982.

Post-breakup
Band founder Jerome Prister went on to form the short-lived off-shoot group Output and later released several solo singles, along with a 1989 studio album, under the name Jerome "Secret Weapon" Prister.  He died of a stroke in 2007.

Singer Michele Blackmon, who also co-wrote "Must Be the Music," later began working as a unit team member managing inmates at a correctional facility, although she would continue performing/entertaining on the side until shortly before her death in late 2014.

Secret Weapon's Djuana "DJ" Thomas is a radio personality on Atlanta's WRDA.

One-time lead vocalist Stanley Snider (credited as "'The' Roy Skip Snider" in liner notes for the band's self-titled album) went on to release several solo singles after the dissolution of the group but would never officially join another group, opting to work more behind the scenes, creating and producing several groups.  The founder of a health insurance non-profit, Snider currently works as the CEO of this company and recently announced his return to singing.

Original members
Djuana "DJ" Thomas - vocals
Michele Blackmon - vocals
Kevin Walker - keyboards
Russell Thomas - lead guitar
Jeff Bell - rhythm guitar
Jerome Prister - bass, vocals
Ricci Paige - drums
Darren Steward - percussion

Other members (at various times)
Stanley Snider - vocals
Bobby Coleman- vocals
Frank Prato - background vocals
Calvin Fields - bass guitar
Dave Brown - drums

Discography

Albums

Singles

References

American post-disco music groups
Musical groups from New York City
Prelude Records artists